The Apostolic Vicariate of Requena is a Latin Church apostolic vicariate of the Catholic Church located in the episcopal see of Requena in Peru.

History
 March 2, 1956: Established as Apostolic Vicariate of Requena from the suppressed Vicariate Apostolic of Ucayali (along with two other vicariates: Vicariate Apostolic of Pucallpa and Vicariate Apostolic of San Ramon).

Bishops
 Vicars Apostolic of Requena, in reverse chronological order
 Bishop Juan Tomás Oliver Climent, O.F.M. (July 30, 2005 – present)
 Bishop Victor de la Peña Pérez, O.F.M. (May 15, 1987 – July 30, 2005)
 Bishop Odorico Leovigildo Sáiz Pérez, O.F.M. (November 26, 1973 – May 15, 1987)
 Bishop Valeriano Ludovico Arroyo Paniego, O.F.M. (January 26, 1957 – November 26, 1973)

Coadjutor bishop
Juan Tomás Oliver Climent, O.F.M. (2004-2005)

Auxiliary bishop
Victor de la Peña Pérez, O.F.M. (1982-1987), appointed Vicar Apostolic here

References

External links
 GCatholic.org
 Catholic Hierarchy 

Apostolic vicariates
Roman Catholic dioceses in Peru
Christian organizations established in 1956
1956 establishments in Peru
Roman Catholic dioceses and prelatures established in the 20th century